is a style of Japanese Buddhist chant, used mainly in the Tendai and Shingon sects. There are two styles: ryokyoku and rikkyoku, described as difficult and easy to remember, respectively.

Shōmyō, like gagaku, employs the Yo scale, a pentatonic scale with ascending intervals of two, three, two, two, and three semitones.

References

Bibliography
 Hill, Jackson (1982). Ritual Music in Japanese Esoteric Buddhism: Shingon Shōmyō, Ethnomusicology 26 (1), 27-39

External links
What Appears Through Chanting: Tendai Shomyo Ryokyoku
http://jtrad.columbia.jp/eng/s_tendai.html
http://www.eastvalley.or.jp/eng/kyoku.html
http://sound.jp/tengaku/Shichseikai-e/shomyo-e4.html

Buddhist music
Japanese styles of music
Buddhist chants
Japanese traditional music